Alifu Dhaalu Atoll (also known as Southern Ari Atoll or Ari Atholhu Dhekunuburi) is an administrative division of the Maldives.

The separation of Ari Atoll (formerly Alifu Atoll) on March 1, 1984, into a Northern and a Southern section formed the two most recent administrative divisions of the Maldives, namely Alifu Alifu Atoll  and Alifu Dhaalu Atoll. Alifu Dhaalu Atoll lies south of the line between the channels of Himendhoo Dhekunukandu and Genburugau Kandu.

There is an ancient mosque in Fenfushi island having wooden decorated ceilings and lacquerwork panels.

Buddhist remains, including a stupa, have been found in Ariadhoo Island.

Whale sharks are year-round residents of Alif Dhaal Atoll.

Geography
The South Ari Atoll administrative division consists of the southern part of the geographic or natural Ari Atoll (described as Southern Ari Atoll in this context to differentiate from the official name of the administrative division). The atoll consists of Inhabited Islands and Uninhabited Island, a definition which includes resort islands, airport islands and industrial islands.

Inhabited islands

Resort islands
Resort islands are classified as Uninhabited Islands which have been converted to become resorts. The following are the resort islands, with the official name of the resort.

References

 Divehi Tārīkhah Au Alikameh. Divehi Bahāi Tārikhah Khidmaiykurā Qaumī Markazu. Reprint 1958 edn. Malé 1990. 
 Divehiraajjege Jōgrafīge Vanavaru. Muhammadu Ibrahim Lutfee. G.Sōsanī.
 Xavier Romero-Frias,  The Maldive Islanders, A Study of the Popular Culture of an Ancient Ocean Kingdom. Barcelona 1999.

Administrative atolls of the Maldives
Atolls of the Maldives